Spock was a U.S. search website specialized in finding people; also known as a vertical search engine or entity search engine. The name "Spock" is a backronym: "single point of contact (by) keyword." Founded in 2006 by Jay Bhatti and Jaideep Singh, it "indexed over 250 million people representing over 1.5 billion data records." These records were from publicly available sources, including Wikipedia, IMDb, ESPN, LinkedIn, Hi5, MySpace, Friendster, Facebook, YouTube, Flickr, Twitter, corporate biographies, university faculty and staff pages, real estate agents sites, school alumni and member directory pages, etc. The company maintained that "30% of all Internet searches are people-related".

As entity resolution is the main algorithmic hurdle of their indexing endeavour, Spock issued and awarded the Spock Challenge Prize. The winning entry combines various machine learning algorithms.

Spock opened its service to public beta on August 8, 2007.

On April 30, 2009, Spock was acquired by Intelius.

References

External links
Spock - People Search
Spock - the People Search Engine Co-founder, Jay Bhatti, interviewed by Stan Relihan on The Connections Show (audio podcast)
Why I'm so excited about Spock by Tim O'Reilly

Internet search engines
Internet properties established in 2006